Living Architecture is a not-for-profit  holiday home rental company in the UK. 
It was founded by philosopher and writer Alain de Botton, who launched the scheme in 2010 in what its website claims is the first programme of its kind.

The houses include:

The Balancing Barn, near Aldeburgh, Suffolk: opened October 2010. Architect: MVRDV with Mole as Executive Architect
The Shingle House, Dungeness,  Kent: opened Nov 2010. Architect: Nord architecture
The Dune House, Thorpeness, Suffolk: opened Dec 2010. Architect: JVA with Mole  as Executive Architect
A Room for London, on the roof of the Queen Elizabeth Hall, South Bank, London: opened 2012. A collaboration with cultural organisation Artangel. Launched as part of the 2012 Cultural Olympiad. Architect: David Kohn and artist Fiona Banner.
The Long House, Cockthorpe, Norfolk: opening Oct 2011. Architect: Hopkins Architects
Secular Retreat, Completed in 2019. Architect: Peter Zumthor with Mole as Executive Architect  
A House for Essex (or "Julie’s House"), Wrabness, Essex: opened in 2015. Created by the artist Grayson Perry, working with Fashion Architecture Taste (FAT)

References

External links 
 

Vacation rental
Hotel and leisure companies of the United Kingdom
Works by Alain de Botton